A bustle is a padded undergarment used to add fullness, or support the drapery, at the back of women's dresses in the mid-to-late 19th century. Bustles are worn under the skirt in the back, just below the waist, to keep the skirt from dragging. Heavy fabric tended to pull the back of a skirt down and flatten it. As a result a woman's petticoated skirt would lose its shape during everyday wear (from merely sitting down or moving about).

History

In the early stages of the fashion for the bustle, the fullness to the back of the skirts was carried quite low and often fanned out to create a train. The transition from the voluminous crinoline-enhanced skirts of the 1850s and 1860s can be seen in the loops and gathers of fabric and trimmings worn during this period. The bustle later evolved into a much more pronounced humped shape on the back of the skirt immediately below the waist, with the fabric of the skirts falling quite sharply to the floor, changing the shape of the silhouette.

Transition from crinoline (1867–1872)
As the fashion for crinolines wore on, their shape changed. Instead of the large bell-like silhouette previously in vogue, they began to flatten out at the front and sides, creating more fullness at the back of the skirts. One type of crinoline, the crinolette, created a shape very similar to the one produced by a bustle. Crinolettes were more restrictive than traditional crinolines, as the flat front and bulk created around the posterior made sitting down more difficult for the wearer. The excess skirt fabric created by this alteration in shape was looped around to the back, again creating increased fullness

Early bustle (1869–1876)
The bustle later developed into a feature of fashion on its own after the overskirt of the late 1860s was draped up toward the back and some kind of support was needed for the new draped shape. Fullness of some sort was still considered necessary to make the waist look smaller and the bustle eventually replaced the crinoline completely. The bustle was worn in different shapes for most of the 1870s and 1880s, with a short period of non-bustled, flat-backed dresses from 1878 to 1882.

Late bustle (1881–1889)

The bustle reappeared in late 1881, and was exaggerated to become a major fashion feature in the mid and late 1880s, in 1885 reaching preposterous proportions to modern eyes, as used in the play Arms and the Man by George Bernard Shaw. The fashion for large bustles ended in 1889.

1889–1913
The bustle then survived into the 1890s and early 20th century, as a skirt support was still needed and the stylish shape dictated a curve in the back of the skirt to balance the curve of the bust in front. The bustle had completely disappeared by 1905, as the long corset of the early 20th century was now successful in shaping the body to protrude behind.

Contemporary fashion
Bustles and bustle gowns are rarely worn in contemporary society. Notable exceptions occur in the realm of haute couture, bridal fashion, steampunk fashion and Lolita fashion. Bustles are employed as part of period costuming in film and theatre: an example would be the 1992 film Bram Stoker's Dracula, for which costume designer Eiko Ishioka won an Academy Award. The film features several extravagant bustle gowns created for female leads Winona Ryder and Sadie Frost.

Other usage
 Bustle was also the term used for an additional external space at the rear of a tank's turret used for storing extra equipment, a notable usage being the added box at the rear of the turret on the Sherman Firefly variant.  Its positioning on the vehicle resembling the similar placement of the bustle as used on the dress item.

 In sailboat design, a bustle stern refers to any kind of stern that has a large "bustle" or blister at the waterline below the stern to prevent the stern from "squatting" when getting underway, or to a similar shape produced by the IOR measuring system in the late '70, '80 and early '90s.

 The term bustleback was used to describe cars styled with an additional rear protrusion that were produced in the early 1980s, such as the Cadillac Bustleback Seville.

Gallery

See also
 1870s in fashion
 1880s in fashion
 Corset
 Crinoline
 Victorian fashion

References

External links 
 

1860s fashion
1870s fashion
1880s fashion
1890s fashion
1900s fashion
Foundation garments
History of clothing (Western fashion)
History of fashion
Lingerie
Victorian fashion
Women's clothing